Robert Coogan (December 13, 1924 – May 12, 1978) was an American film and television actor.

Biography
Robert Coogan was born in Glendale, California, to parents Jack Coogan Sr. and Lillian Coogan. His older brother was Jackie Coogan, perhaps Hollywood's most famous child star of the 1920s. Coogan's only child is Jonathan Coogan. Coogan's nephew is stereographer and 3D producer Anthony Coogan and his grand-nephew Keith Coogan is also an actor.

Starting as a child actor, Robert Coogan made his film debut as Sooky in Skippy (1931), a comedy-drama family film which was nominated for an Academy Award for Best Picture. He also reprised the role of Sooky in its sequel Sooky (1931). In addition to his appearance in Skippy, Coogan appeared in over one dozen other films and made one appearance in a television production. Coogan continued acting in adulthood, but only with minor success. He portrayed the role of Humphrey Pennyworth in the Joe Palooka B-movies.

Filmography

Notes

External links
 
 Photographs and literature

1924 births
1978 deaths
American male child actors
American male film actors
American male television actors
Male actors from Glendale, California
20th-century American male actors